The Story Girl is a 1911 novel by Canadian author L. M. Montgomery. It narrates the adventures of a group of young cousins and their friends who live in a rural community on Prince Edward Island, Canada.

In 1917, Montgomery opined that The Story Girl was her favorite of the novels she had written by that time.

Overview
The book is narrated by Beverley, who together with his brother Felix, has come to live with his Aunt Janet and Uncle Alec King on their farm while their father travels for business. They spend their leisure time with their cousins Dan, Felicity and Cecily King, hired boy Peter Craig, neighbor Sara Ray and another cousin, Sara Stanley. The latter is the Story Girl of the title, and she entertains the group with fascinating tales including various events in the King family history. 
The book is actually two stories; those of Beverley King and his friends, and the tales told by the Story Girl. 
Montgomery had grown up in a Scottish-Canadian family, where stories, legends, and myths from Scotland were often told, and she drew upon this background in creating the character of Stanley, who excels at the telling of tales. The Canadian scholar Elizabeth Waterson noted at the book begins with "...the Story Girl winning the ultimate accolade in the eyes of the Scottish community, when her facility at telling an old story squeezes a five dollar donation out of an old curmudgeon". Stanley in her first scene stands "gay and graceful" and promises she can tell some "witch stories" that "will freeze the blood in your veins". Unlike Montgomery's better known character Anne Shirley, whose wild, improbable stories are clearly those of a child while her later stories are those of a young adult, the Story Girl is at the age of 14, an accomplished story-teller whose achievements are beyond her age. The character of Peter Craig bears a strong resemblance to Herman Leard, the great love of Montgomery's life, the man she wished she had married, but did not. Sara the story girl wins the love of Peter, and bests her more pretty rival Felicity for his affections not through her looks, but rather because of her sense of humor, her ability to see what others cannot, and a mystical sense of the beauty of the world.< Montgomery wrote about the difference between the two: "Her face was like a rose of youth. But when the Story Girl spoke, we forgot to look at Felicity". The Story girl has a somewhat dreamy quality not only to her stories, but herself as she says "I'd like a dress of moonshine with stars for buttons".

At the time she was writing the novel in 1909–10, Montgomery was engaged to a Presbyterian minister whom she did not love, the Reverend Ewen Macdonald, whom she was to marry in 1911, and in the book, Montgomery has the characters give mock-sermons that ridiculed the speaking styles of Presbyterian ministers. Montgomery knew when she wed Macdonald that she would leave Prince Edward Island for Ontario, and at the time she started writing the book in the summer of 1909 was overcome with nostalgia for her teenage years. Montgomery drew upon her diaries of her life to teenager as inspiration for the novel.

The depressed character Sara Ray reflected another aspect of Montgomery's personality as she often suffered from melancholia. Just as Sara the Story Girl shines, so does the "other Sara" stand in her shadow, a sad girl unable to find happiness. Likewise, the characters of overweight Felix who is full of self-doubt is contrasted to his cousin, the beautiful and proud Felicity. The conflict between Felicity, who only wants to find a good man to marry when she grows up and who expresses envy over the Story Girl, reflected the tension that Montgomery herself felt between her desire to be writer vs. the popular expectation that she would marry and abandon her writing career. Like Montgomery, the Story Girl longs for an absent father whom she never sees. At the time she was writing the book, several of Montgomery's relatives had recently died, causing her to have an obsession with death. Moreover, Montgomery's parents and Leard were all dead by this time, leaving her with wounds that never healed. However, in the book, death is often spoken in, but mocked with the threat of death being reduced down to a sick cat and case of measles, through Stanley's story about the arrogant princess who refused love and married death hints at the more darker side of Montgomery's personality. At one point, the characters find a portrait of God that terrifies them depicting the Lord of the Hosts as "the stern, angrily-frowing old man with the tossing hair and bread" that appears to be inspired by William Blake painting Urizen. Through the teenagers are frightened, it is all presented very humorously as mere triflings. Despite the light tone, the Story Girl's tales about angels whose love was forbidden changed the constellations and that of the proud man who blasphemed God's name and was punished by torn apart by Satan's claw forever in Hell shows the more serious side of Montgomery's faith.

A recurring theme is that the central story of the relationships between the teenagers listening to the Story Girl are presented in a light-hearted manner while the stories told by the Story Girl are often more serious. Montgomery has the Story Girl tell 32 different stories over the course of the book that variously are comic stories that mock pompous Presbyterian ministers, "Oriental" romances, Scottish folk tales, retellings of Greek myths and poems by Tennyson, and "weird" ghost stories inspired by Edgar Allan Poe. The novel ends in the fall of "royal magnificence of coloring, under the vivid blue autmn sky" where at "the big willow by the gate was a splendid golden dome, and the maples that were scattered through the spruce grove waved blood-red banners over the sombre cone-bearers" with the Story Girl stands with a garland made of leaves.

The sequel to the book is The Golden Road, written in 1913.

The Story Girl was one of the books which inspired the Canadian television series Road to Avonlea.

References

Bibliography 
 Lucy Maud Montgomery, The Story Girl, Grandfather Clock series, flower-ed 2019,

External links 

 
 The Story Girl Build-A-Book Initiative (online text)
 L.M. Montgomery Online Formerly the L.M. Montgomery Research Group, this site includes a blog, extensive lists of primary and secondary materials, detailed information about Montgomery's publishing history, and a filmography of screen adaptations of Montgomery texts. See, in particular, the page about The Story Girl.
 
 L.M. Montgomery's Personal Scrapbooks and Book Covers The Confederation Centre Art Gallery
 The Story Girl and The Golden Road An L.M. Montgomery Resource Page
 The L.M. Montgomery Literary Society This site includes information about Montgomery's works and life and research from the newsletter, The Shining Scroll.

1911 Canadian novels
Novels by Lucy Maud Montgomery
Canadian children's novels
Novels set in Prince Edward Island
1911 children's books